2016 Denmark Open is a darts tournament, which took place in Esbjerg, Denmark on April 30th, 2016.

Results

Last 64

Final 8

References

2016 in darts
2016 in Danish sport
Darts in Denmark